Brian 'BJ' Caldwell (born December 17, 1975) is an American sailor. He spent seven years cruising the South Pacific with his parents when he was young, returning to Hawaii at age 15. He departed Hawaii aged 19 and completed his voyage on September 28, 1996. He was the youngest solo circumnavigator, finishing at the age of 20, making him the first person under age 21 to circumnavigate. He has raced in France in the Mini Transat 6.50, Sydney to Hobart Yacht Race, Fastnet, Transpacific Yacht Race and other sailing races.

Journey
Caldwell departed from Honolulu, Hawaii on June 1, 1995, traveling to Vanuatu, Cocos (Keeling), Mauritius, Durban, Cape Town, St. Helena, Grenada, Panama, and returning to Honolulu on September 28, 1996.

Caldwell reported a number of difficulties on his voyage, "I was rolled by a big wave in the Indian Ocean, I was almost run down by a supertanker. I encountered a lot of storms, especially around South Africa. But nothing that unexpected. It's a given on a circumnavigation."

See also
 List of youth solo sailing circumnavigations

References

External links
 Honolulu Star Bulletin archives
 NW Yachting article
 Brian Caldwell circumnavigation web site

1975 births
Living people
American sailors
People from Hawaii
Teenage single-handed circumnavigating sailors
Single-handed circumnavigating sailors